Maurice R. Coons (July 18, 1902 – October 10, 1930), known by the pen name Armitage Trail, was an American pulp fiction author, known best for his 1929 novel Scarface. This novel was based on the life of gangster Al Capone, and was adapted as the 1932 movie Scarface directed by Howard Hawks and produced by Howard Hughes. The movie of 1932 was later modernized and remade as 1983's movie Scarface. His only other significant work is the detective novel The Thirteenth Guest, though Coons is speculated to have used a variety of pseudonyms.

Biography

Early life 
Armitage Trail was born Maurice R. Coons on July 18, 1902, in Madison, Nebraska. He was the oldest child of Oscar A. Coons and Alice L. Coons, living also with Alice's mother, Mary J. McIntyre. He had two brothers, Hannibal (born Stanley J. Coons) and Eugene, as well as a sister named Evelyn. Due to Oscar's job as a road tour manager for the New Orleans Opera Company, the family relocated multiple times before Trail became an adult, with one definite location being New Orleans. Trail developed a passion for writing, quitting school at the age of 16 to devote his time to it. Likewise, his interest in gangsters such as Al Capone began at a young age, and it was stated by Hannibal Coons that his brother Maurice "was interested in gangsters as other men are interested in postage stamps, old coins, or spread-eagled butterflies.” Throughout the rest of his teens and early twenties, Maurice Coons used a variety of pseudonyms, writing various crime and detective stories for pulp magazines. During this time, he visited New York City, eventually quitting home to live in the vicinity of Chicago, where he wrote Scarface.

Chicago and Scarface 
Not much is known about Trail's time in Illinois. He lived in Oak Park, Illinois, a town adjacent to the west side of Chicago, where he worked on composing Scarface daily in his sun-room. He did not live there long enough to be recorded by an official U.S. Census. Trail spent much of the rest of his time in Chicago, supposedly being associated with local Sicilian gangs by an Italian-American lawyer with whom he was acquainted. From then on, Trail spent his nights socializing with gang members in order to gain ideas for his novel. Trail published Scarface during 1930. Though Trail never formally met Al Capone, with whom his novel was mainly concerned, Capone may have known of the work.

Selling Scarface 
Producer Howard Hughes eventually approached Trail about his novel with the interest of adapting it as a movie. Trail sold the rights to Scarface to Hughes for $25,000, relocating to Los Angeles in the process, where he lived at 3811 Delman Torrace St. After selling the rights to Scarface, W.R. Burnett, who worked on the screenplay, stated that Trail began to struggle with alcoholism. Trail lived flamboyantly in Hollywood, rapidly gaining weight, wearing wide-brimmed Borsalino hats, and hiring a servant named Elijah Ford.

Death 
Trail never lived to see the movie Scarface finished, as during October 1930 he died of heart failure at the Paramount Theatre. He is buried in corridor/building C, crypt 237, the Hollywood Forever Cemetery.

The Thirteenth Guest 
Trail's first novel, published first during 1929, was named The Thirteenth Guest, and concerned the investigation of the murder of fictional character Marie Morgan. A private detective, named in the first movie as Phil Winston and the second as Johnny Smith, surveys the crime scene. The scene is Morgan's grandfather's mansion, where he was also murdered 13 years prior. The novel was later adapted as the movie The Thirteenth Guest during 1932 by Albert Ray, and then was remade as Mystery of the 13th Guest during 1943 by William Beaudine.

Scarface 
Trail's most famous novel, published first during 1930, details the life of Tony "Scarface" Camonte, a character based on gangster Al Capone. The protagonist has the same first name for all three of the Scarface works. After the release of the 1932 movie, at which time Trail was already dead, Capone reportedly sent some of his men to question screenwriter Ben Hecht after Capone was offended at the movie's portrayal of him by actor Paul Muni.

Other works 
It has been speculated that Trail wrote numerous pulp stories, supposedly even whole magazines of them, using a variety of pseudonyms.

References

Bibliography 
 Server, Lee. Encyclopedia of Pulp Fiction Writers. New York, NY (2002)
 
 

20th-century American novelists
American crime fiction writers
American male novelists
Novelists from Nebraska
1902 births
1930 deaths
20th-century American male writers
Burials at Hollywood Forever Cemetery
20th-century pseudonymous writers
People from Madison, Nebraska